E 010, commonly known as the Osh-Bishkek Road, is a European B class road in Kyrgyzstan, connecting the cities Osh and Bishkek.

Route 

  ЭМ-04 Road: Bishkek - Kara-Balta - Jalal-Abad - Osh

External links 
 UN Economic Commission for Europe: Overall Map of E-road Network (2007)

International E-road network
Roads in Kyrgyzstan